The term Palo Pinto Mountains properly refers to a specific cuesta-like range of hills in western Palo Pinto County, Texas.   The name Palo Pinto roughly translates to "painted stick" in reference to the juniper trees of the area.  Isolated, rugged, and scenic, the ridge extends some 15 miles, from near the intersection of Texas State Highway 16 and Farm to Market Road 207 in the southwest, to Crawford Mountain just south of the Fortune Bend on the Brazos River in the northeast.

The Palo Pinto Mountains are located in, and form part of, the Carbonate Cross Timbers, a level IV ecoregion defined by the Environmental Protection Agency.  However, the term "Palo Pinto Mountains" is also used colloquially to refer to a much larger area, essentially the entire portion of the much more extensive Western Cross Timbers located north of I-20.  The mountains have been called a northern extension of the Hill Country, and indeed they are both dissected plateaus featuring karst topography with similar vegetation, including post oak (Quercus stellata), blueberry juniper (Juniperus ashei), and mesquite.  The smaller Carbonate Cross Timbers also has a limestone substrate, as does the Hill Country, although the surrounding Western Cross Timbers area is underlain by sandstone, instead.

Human habitation and access

Using the broader colloquial definition of the Palo Pinto Mountains, they cover all of Jack and Palo Pinto Counties, most of Stephens County, large parts of Parker, Montague, and Wise Counties, and smaller portions of Young, Cooke, and Clay Counties.  This area includes the towns of Bowie (on the northwestern fringe), Graham, Jacksboro, Bridgeport, Decatur (on the eastern edge), Breckenridge, Mineral Wells, and Springtown.  It also includes Possum Kingdom Lake and its state park as well as a new state park, not yet open to the public, acquired by the state in 2011.

Using the strict definition of the Palo Pinto Mountains, the only road that crosses the range is US 180, which enters from the east at a pass known as Metcalf Gap, although State Highway 16 south of US 180 runs adjacent to the eastern escarpment of the cuesta.  Speaking of the broader region, however, US 380 and State Highway 114 traverse the area's northern fringes, and US 281 runs north-south through the region; State Highway 59 also runs through the northeastern portion.  Numerous farm-to-market (FM) roads, most notably FM 4, also cross the area.

References

Mountain ranges of Texas
Landforms of Palo Pinto County, Texas